Matt Kramer (born August 10, 1968) is the current lead vocalist of the American glam metal band Saigon Kick.

Biography
Kramer sang on their first two albums. The second album, The Lizard, propelled Kramer's lead vocals and the band to a top-10 single on the Billboard charts, and a number-one MTV request countdown video with the ballad "Love Is on the Way", which is still played on radio stations around the world on regular rotation.

Kramer has also sung for several other bands, including Coma and Soul Star.

He released a solo album titled War and Peas, which was self-produced, and released on his label Lascivious.

He has also written a book of poetry entitled An American Profit (Lascivious Books).

Discography

With Saigon Kick 
Saigon Kick (1991)
The Lizard (1992)

Solo 
 War and Peas (2002), Lascivious Recording Co.

Literary releases / poetry books 

 "An American Profit", 2007, Lascivious Books
 "A Book of Poems from the Smallest of Towns", 2011, Lascivious Books

References

External links 
 www.mattkramer.net

American rock singers
Saigon Kick members
Living people
1968 births
Glam metal musicians
American heavy metal musicians
American hard rock musicians